The  opened in Kyoto, Japan, in 1988. The collection amassed by the Museum's founder, pachinko magnate and izakaya operator , comprises some 1,700 objects including Goryeo celadons, Joseon white porcelain, Buddhist art, Korean folk art, archaeological materials, and paintings, including Heron by Kim Myeong-guk with an inscription by Hayashi Razan.

See also
 Kyoto National Museum
 List of Goryeo Buddhist paintings
 Minhwa
 History of Japan–Korea relations

References

External links
  Koryo Museum of Art
  Collection

Museums in Kyoto
Museums established in 1988
1988 establishments in Japan
Cultural history of Korea
Korean pottery
Goryeo